Merci (French for "thank you") is a brand of chocolate candy manufactured by the German company August Storck. Merci is manufactured as bars of different kinds of chocolate with different fillings, such as plain milk chocolate, coffee and cream, hazelnut-almond, hazelnut crème, marzipan, praline-cream, dark cream, and dark mousse. Each flavor has its own individual color; the chocolate is sold in over 70 countries, and in 2015, it tried to break into the Chinese market. The brand was recommended by Bustle for its variety and affordability.

References

Further reading

External links
 Official website

August Storck brands
German brands
German confectionery
Brand name confectionery
Candy